Mourad Daami (Arabic: مراد الدعمي; born August 15, 1962) in Monastir is a retired Tunisian football referee. He is known for supervising the 2000 African Cup of Nations Final hosted by Nigeria and Ghana and one match during the 2002 FIFA World Cup co hosted by South Korea and Japan.

References

1962 births
Living people
Tunisian football referees
2002 FIFA World Cup referees
CONCACAF Gold Cup referees
Olympic football referees